The M13 is a road in the Luapula Province of Zambia that connects Chipili with Kawambwa.

It starts at a junction with the M3 Road (Kasama-Mansa Road) approximately 23 kilometres north of the Chipili town centre and it heads north for 88 kilometres to end in the town centre of Kawambwa at a junction with the D19, which goes to the town of Mporokoso in the east and the towns of Mbereshi and Nchelenge in the west.

See also 
Roads in Zambia

References 

Roads in Zambia
Luapula Province